"I Am Who I Am" is a song by the Belgian singer Lara Fabian. It was released as the second single of her self-titled album.

Background
I Am Who I Am is an uptempo song, co-written by Fabian and Allison with American duo Carl Sturken and Evan Rogers, who produced the track.

Reception
The Dooyoo review was mixed. It said: "The song is reasonably catchy, but not particularly memorable, and this isn't a great introduction to Fabian's true vocal abilities. 6/10".

Track list
 
I Am Who I Am (Chris Lord-Alge remix)
I Am Who I Am (HQ2 radio mix)
I Am Who I Am (Bastone and Bernstein radio edit)
I Am Who I Am (Major Tom version)
Before We Say Goodbye

Official versions 

 Album version – 3:45
 Chris Lord-Algé remix – 3:53
 Major Tom version – 3:40
 Bastone and Bernstein radio edit – 3:30
 Soul Solution radio edit – 3:05
 HQ2 club mix – 9:00
 HQ2 radio mix – 3:30

Music video
There is a music video for the song.

Charts

References

2000 singles
2000 songs
Lara Fabian songs
Songs written by Carl Sturken and Evan Rogers